Girls Aloud were an  pop girl group that was created through the ITV talent show Popstars: The Rivals in 2002. The group comprised singers Cheryl, Nadine Coyle, Sarah Harding, Nicola Roberts and Kimberley Walsh. The group achieved a string of twenty consecutive top ten singles in the United Kingdom, including four number ones. They also achieved seven certified albums, of which two reached number one. They have been nominated for five Brit Awards, winning the 2009 Best Single for "The Promise".

The group's musical style is pop, but they had experimented with electropop, dance-pop and dance-rock throughout their career. Girls Aloud's collaborations with Brian Higgins and his songwriting and production team Xenomania earned the group critical acclaim, due to an innovative approach to mainstream pop music. The group became one of the few UK reality television acts to achieve continued success, amassing a fortune of £30 million by May 2010. Guinness World Records lists them as the "Most Successful Reality TV Group" in the 2007 edition. They also hold the record for "Most Consecutive Top Ten Entries in the UK by a Female Group" in the 2008 edition, and are credited again for "Most Successful Reality TV Group" in the 2011 edition. The group was also named the United Kingdom's biggest selling girl group of the 21st century, with over 4.3 million singles sales and 4 million albums sold in the UK alone. The group disbanded in March 2013 following the conclusion of the Ten: The Hits Tour.

History

2002: Popstars: The Rivals

Girls Aloud was formed on 30 November 2002 in front of millions of viewers on ITV's Popstars: The Rivals. The concept of the programme, hosted by Big Brother presenter Davina McCall, was to produce a boyband and a girlgroup who would be "rivals" and compete for the 2002 Christmas number one single. Following the initial success of Hear'Say (winners of the original Popstars show), several thousand applicants attended auditions across the United Kingdom in hope of being selected. Ten girls and ten boys were chosen as finalists by judges Pete Waterman, Louis Walsh and Spice Girls member Geri Halliwell. However, two of these were disqualified before the live shows began: Hazel Kaneswaran was found to be too old to participate, while Nicola Ward refused to sign the contract, claiming the pay the group would receive was too low. Kimberley Walsh and Nicola Roberts were chosen as their replacements.

During October and November, the finalists took to the stage participating in weekly Saturday night live performances (alternating week-by-week between the girls and boys). Each week the contestant polling the fewest phone votes was eliminated until the final line-ups of the groups emerged. The five girls who made it into the group were Cheryl Tweedy, Nicola Roberts, Nadine Coyle, Kimberley Walsh, and Sarah Harding; Javine Hylton missed out on a place in the group, despite previous expectations that she would be placed in the line-up. The group was named Girls Aloud and were managed by Louis Walsh  until 2005 when Hilary Shaw replaced him.

The new group competed with the boys' winning group, One True Voice to have 2002's Christmas number one single. Girls Aloud won the battle with their single "Sound of the Underground", produced by Brian Higgins and Xenomania. The song spent four consecutive weeks at number one and was certified platinum in March 2003. The song received critical acclaim; Alexis Petridis of The Guardian stated that "it proved a first: it was a reality pop record that didn't make you want to do physical harm to everyone involved in its manufacture".

2002–2005: Sound of the Underground and What Will the Neighbours Say?
After the success of their first single "Sound of the Underground", Girls Aloud spent five months recording the follow-up single and their debut album. Sound of the Underground was completed in April 2003 and released the following month. The album entered the charts at number two and was certified platinum by the British Phonographic Industry. The second single, "No Good Advice", was also released in May 2003 to similar success. Girls Aloud's third single, "Life Got Cold", charted at number three in August 2003. In November 2003, Girls Aloud released a cover version of the Pointer Sisters' 1980s dance hit "Jump". The single, which charted at number two, accompanied a new edition of Sound of the Underground.

After a brief hiatus, Girls Aloud released "The Show" in June 2004, the first single from What Will the Neighbours Say?, the group's second album. The single entered the charts at number two. The next single, "Love Machine", also peaked at number two in September 2004. Girls Aloud then recorded a cover of The Pretenders' "I'll Stand by You" which was released as the official Children in Need charity single. The song was not well received by critics; however, the cover became Girls Aloud's second number one single, holding the position for two weeks.

The album What Will the Neighbours Say? was entirely written and produced by Xenomania. Upon its release on 29 November 2004, the album charted just outside of the top five and was quickly certified platinum. The final single from the album, "Wake Me Up", was released in February 2005. It charted at number four, making it their first to miss the top three. In early 2005, the group was nominated for a BRIT Award for Best Pop Act. Following the album's success, Girls Aloud announced their first tour, the What Will the Neighbours Say...? Tour, which took place in May 2005. The group also released their first DVD, Girls on Film.

2005–2007: Chemistry and The Sound of Girls Aloud

Following their first tour, Girls Aloud began work on their third studio album, Chemistry. The album peaked on the UK Albums Charts at number eleven and received platinum certification. The first single from the album, "Long Hot Summer" was released in August 2005. The single ended Girls Aloud's run of top five singles when it charted at number seven. The follow-up single from the album, "Biology" was released in November 2005. The song was critically acclaimed; Peter Cashmore of The Guardian labeled it "the best pop single of the last decade". The release was followed by a cover of Dee C. Lee's "See the Day", released in the Christmas week of 2005., following this they presented one-off TV Special, Christmas Mania, on ITV, where they sang songs taken from their Christmas album. Girls Aloud won the Heart Award for the single at the O2 Silver Clef Lunch. The group travelled to Australia and New Zealand in February 2006 to release "Biology" and Chemistry. Despite, a one-week promotional tour, "Biology" peaked at number twenty-six on the ARIA Singles Chart, failing to break the group in the Australian market. "Whole Lotta History", the fourth and final single to be taken from Chemistry, was released in March 2006 and charted at number six.

In 2005, Girls Aloud filmed a one-off documentary entitled Girls Aloud: Home Truths for ITV2. The success of the show later made way for Off the Record, a six-part fly on the wall documentary series for E4. Girls Aloud then appeared in an episode of Ghosthunting with... (without Nadine) towards the end of 2006, in which Yvette Fielding guided them through haunted locations. In May 2006, Girls Aloud embarked on their first arena tour, the Chemistry Tour. In the same month, Girls Aloud were moved to Fascination Records, a sub-label of Polydor Records. 

In October 2006, Girls Aloud released their first greatest hits collection, The Sound of Girls Aloud: The Greatest Hits. It debuted at number one on the UK album chart and went on to sell over one million copies. The album was accompanied by the single "Something Kinda Ooooh". Girls Aloud became the first British act to reach the top five purely on download sales; the single peaked at number three following its physical release. The next single was a cover of "I Think We're Alone Now" which peaked at number four on the UK Singles Chart. In March 2007, Girls Aloud collaborated with fellow British girl group Sugababes for the cover of the song "Walk This Way" by Aerosmith. Billed as "Sugababes vs. Girls Aloud", the song served as the official single for Comic Relief which became the group's third number one. In May 2007, Girls Aloud embarked on their third tour, The Greatest Hits Tour.

2007–2009: Tangled Up, Out of Control and hiatus
Girls Aloud released their fourth studio album, Tangled Up, in November 2007. The first single from the album, "Sexy! No No No..." peaked at number-five on the UK Singles Chart. The second single, "Call the Shots" entered the top three. The third and final single from the album, "Can't Speak French", continued Girls Aloud's top ten streak. The release of the single coincided with Girls Aloud's second television series, The Passions of Girls Aloud. The show revolved around each member, with the exception of Coyle, achieving aspirations outside of the group. Girls Aloud also received their second BRIT Award nomination in 2008, nominated for the Best British Group award. In May 2008, Girls Aloud embarked on the Tangled Up Tour which consisted of 34 concerts around the United Kingdom.

Girls Aloud then recorded two tracks for the soundtrack to the movie, St Trinian's. They also made a cameo appearance in the film as the school band. The soundtrack was released on 10 December 2007, and the video for "Theme to St. Trinian's" premiered in December 2007.

In November 2008, Girls Aloud released their fifth studio album and would be their final studio album Out of Control, which entered the UK Albums Chart at number one and became their most successful studio album to date, being certified double platinum. The album's lead single, "The Promise", became the group's fourth number one on the UK Singles Chart. The single also returned the group to the top two on the Irish Singles Chart. "The Promise" was awarded Best British Single at the 2009 BRIT Awards; the group also performed the song during the ceremony. For the promotion of the album, Girls Aloud appeared in a variety show entitled The Girls Aloud Party which aired on 13 December 2008 on ITV.

The second single from Out of Control was "The Loving Kind"; the track was produced by Xenomania. The song peaked at number ten, becoming Girls Aloud's twentieth consecutive top ten single. The final single from the album, "Untouchable" was released in April 2009. It peaked at number eleven on the UK Singles Chart, becoming the first single of Girls Aloud to miss the top ten. Girls Aloud embarked on the Out of Control Tour, which ran from April to June 2009. Their label, Fascination Records released a singles boxset collection to coincide with the tour.

In February 2009, Girls Aloud signed a new record deal with Fascination that would see the group release another three studio albums. However, in July 2009, Girls Aloud announced that they were taking a year-long hiatus to pursue solo projects, but would reunite for a new studio album in 2010 which did not materialise. Two months later, Girls Aloud briefly interrupted the hiatus to do two shows supporting Coldplay along with Jay-Z at Wembley Stadium.

2012–2013: Ten and disbandment 
After three years of hiatus, Girls Aloud reunited for the group's 10th anniversary. On 16 November 2012, the group released their new single, "Something New" which was the official charity single for Children in Need. The single peaked at number-two on the UK Singles Chart. The group released their second greatest hits compilation, Ten on 23 November 2012. The second single taken from Ten, "Beautiful 'Cause You Love Me," was released on 17 December 2012. The single failed to chart in the top-forty. A documentary special entitled Girls Aloud: Ten Years at the Top aired on ITV1 on 15 December 2012. In February 2013, the group embarked on Ten: The Hits Tour. On 20 March 2013, the group performed their final concert at Echo Arena Liverpool. A few hours later, they announced their split on Twitter.

2021: Death of Sarah Harding 
On 26 August 2020, Harding stated that she had been diagnosed with breast cancer that had advanced to "other parts" of her body. In March 2021, she said that the disease was terminal and that she "won't see another Christmas". She died on the morning of 5 September 2021, aged 39. In April 2022 it was reported that the remaining members of Girls Aloud were planning a one-off tribute concert in Harding's memory to raise money for medical equipment for cancer patients. On 24 July 2022, Girls Aloud reunited for a 5K run in Hyde Park to raise awareness and money for breast cancer research. Tweedy, Roberts, and Coyle participated in the event with Walsh taking part in a remote event. However, on 17 October 2022 talking on This Morning, Kimberly Walsh ruled out a further reunion for the celebration of their 20th anniversary, saying that it would be "too painful".

Other endeavours
Girls Aloud came together with Mattel in 2005 to produce Fashion Fever Barbies. Each member designed the outfit and look of a doll modelled after themselves. In addition to live DVDs of their tours and both of Girls Aloud's television series, the group has also released Girls on Film and Style. Official calendars were also issued annually from 2004 to 2009, the only exception being 2005. Girls Aloud co-wrote an autobiography titled Dreams That Glitter – Our Story. The book, named after a lyric in "Call the Shots", was published in October 2008 through the Transworld imprint Bantam Press. Before the release, OK! magazine bought the rights to preview and serialise the book.

In 2007, Girls Aloud signed a £1.25m one-year deal to endorse hair care brand Sunsilk. The girls filmed a television advertisement and appeared in and magazine advertisements, with each of the five members being the face of a different shampoo. The same year, Girls Aloud also signed a deal with the UK division of Samsung. They endorsed mobile phones and MP3 players, made personal appearances and sang at Samsung events, and contributed to competition prizes, among other activities. The Samsung F210 Purple came with a 1GB memory card featuring Girls Aloud content. Girls Aloud appeared in television advertisements for Nintendo DS the following year. The group signed a deal to front a promotional campaign for a new low-calorie KitKat bar called "Senses" in March 2008. The chocolate bar manufacturer also sponsored Girls Aloud's Tangled Up Tour. The exact worth of the endorsement is unknown, but a figure of £500,000 each has been suggested. Sales increased 6.8% in the United Kingdom.

Beginning in 2009, Girls Aloud teamed with Eylure to release five sets of false eyelashes, each set designed by a different member of the band. A range of festival-themed lashes followed in 2010, while limited edition "10th Anniversary" lash was released in 2012. Similarly, to celebrate their tenth anniversary, each member designed a charm bracelet for Pandora, available as either a complete bracelet or a "starter" bracelet.

Philanthropy
All five members of the group have been involved in charity work. Girls Aloud's cover of The Pretenders' "I'll Stand by You" was released as the official 2004 Children in Need single, with proceeds going to the charity. Nicola Roberts said, "Hopefully if our single does well it's a lot of money going to the charity." Their cover Aerosmith and Run DMC's "Walk This Way", a collaboration with the Sugababes, was the official charity single for Comic Relief in 2007, recorded at Comic Relief co-founder and trustee Richard Curtis' request. Kimberley Walsh said, "It's a fantastic song and hopefully will raise tons of money for people living in really difficult situations here and in Africa." In March 2009, Cheryl, Kimberley Walsh, and various other celebrities climbed Mount Kilimanjaro in aid of Comic Relief. The trek raised £3.4 million for the charity. Between 3 February and 23 March 2009, the celebrities involved in the Kilimanjaro trek also raised money for Comic Relief by providing the voice for the BT Speaking Clock. Walsh is also a charity ambassador for Breast Cancer Haven. She helped open a £2.2 million breast cancer centre in 2008 and participated in a "heel-a-thon" in 2009. In February 2011, Cheryl Cole launched her own charitable foundation named the "Cheryl Cole Foundation with The Prince's Trust following a meeting with The Trust's President, Charles, Prince of Wales". The foundation provides vital funds for The Trust in the North East, helping disadvantaged young people from her own region. Girls Aloud celebrated their 10 years as a group by releasing another Children in Need single, "Something New", which they performed on the Children in Need TV special on 16 November 2012.

Artistry

Musical style
Girls Aloud worked closely with Brian Higgins and his songwriting and production team Xenomania throughout their career. Xenomania produced all of Girls Aloud's albums and singles, excluding nine songs from their debut album, Sound of the Underground, the charity single "Walk This Way" and two songs from Ten. Of Higgins and Xenomania, Girls Aloud's former manager Louis Walsh says, "He just makes great songs for radio. They just jump out at you and stay in your brain." In a review of the group's debut single "Sound of the Underground", The Guardian'''s Alexis Petridis exclaimed it "proved a first: it was a reality pop record that didn't make you want to do physical harm to everyone involved in its manufacture." In response to Girls Aloud's debut album, Jacqueline Hodges of BBC Music said that "Higgins injects an element of instant-catchy-cool to the songs without going overboard in trying to shape uber-chic dance floor hits."

Petridis of The Guardian described What Will the Neighbours Say? as "a great album: funny, clever, immediate, richly inventive." He later wrote that Chemistry is "a record that dispenses with the tiresome business of verses and instead opts for songs apparently constructed by stitching eight different choruses together." Talia Kraines of BBC Music exclaimed that Girls Aloud "have resuscitated [pop music's] corpse by wedding chart-friendly melodies to experimental avant-garde sounds". "Biology" was described as "about as far from tired formula as you can possibly get. It sounds like three separate melodies condensed into one." Popjustice referred to the song as "pop music which redefines the supposed boundaries of pop music." In a review for 2007's "Sexy! No No No...", Nick Levine of Digital Spy complimented Xenomania's work on the song: sacrificing "conventional song structure in the name of keeping [...] hooks coming thick and fast – and quite right too."

Influences
The band members themselves are known to be fans of artists such as Ne-Yo, Oasis, and Michael Jackson.

The group's debut album Sound of the Underground takes influence from a number of 1980s genres, such as synthpop, power pop, and new wave, and 1990s styles like big beat, drum and bass, and garage. The album received comparisons to girl groups such as Bananarama, The Bangles, and the Spice Girls. Similarities to Kylie Minogue and Madonna were also noted. A majority of the songs make use of guitars and electronic beats. The rise of indie rock also inspired Brian Higgins to "blur the edges between commercial music and so-called 'indie' music." He continued, "pop music was on its backside and indie music was about to rise, through The Strokes and everything else. We were an independent company and we were as indie as the other bands around us. The guitar riff on No Good Advice is very very similar to the riff on the track Michael by Franz Ferdinand." What Will the Neighbours Say? further explores different subgenres of pop, especially electropop. Synthesizers are more prominent on the album, although the usage of guitar remains prominent in several songs. The backing track to "Love Machine", composed by Xenomania musicians Tim Powell and Nick Coler, was inspired by The Smiths, while "Wake Me Up" includes a guitar riff inspired by garage rock.Chemistry takes influences from a wide variety of sources, including "everything from French chanson to piano-pounding blues to the clipped R&B of the Small Faces". Rapping in the same vein as artists like Betty Boo and Neneh Cherry is prominent. Yahoo! Music says "there's nary a 'formula' in sight. There are as many sudden tonal and tempo switches as the tricksiest Chicago art rock band. And all but one song here gives guitars a starring role." The songs are noticeably less rooted in electronic music, although "Swinging London Town" is "a dark, squiggly synth pop epic a la Pet Shop Boys" and "It's Magic" is composed of "little Röyksopp-like keyboard riffs". Alternatively, Tangled Up features a dancier, more electronic sound, inspired by the success of their 2006 single "Something Kinda Ooooh". "Call the Shots", "Close to Love", and "Girl Overboard" are all electropop numbers reminiscent of 1980s music. However, "Control of the Knife" is more inspired by reggae and ska, while "Black Jacks" recalls "sixties psychedelica". Out of Control features a number of songs inspired by 1980s electropop, while also exploring retro styles. "The Promise" is a 1960s Spector-influenced number, while "Rolling Back the Rivers in Time" was compared to the works of Burt Bacharach.

Legacy

Girls Aloud's debut single "Sound of the Underground" and another Xenomania production, Sugababes' "Round Round", have been called "two huge groundbreaking hits", credited with reshaping British pop music for the 2000s. The Telegraph placed the song at number 15 on a list of 100 songs that defined the 2000s, while NME included it at number 39. Spinner.com named "Sound of the Underground" the eighth best British song of the 2000s. In 2009, The Times included 2007's Tangled Up at number 62 on a list of the decade's best pop albums. MSN listed 2005's Chemistry as one of the decade's best albums. Girls Aloud were one of the few pop acts to achieve continued success and longevity throughout the mid-2000s while R&B and rock music became more popular. In a review for the group's 2008 Tangled Up Tour, David Pollock of The Independent noted that "Girls Aloud remain confidently the only pop show in town." The Times stated, "Not since ABBA and Michael Jackson has pure pop been so unanimously praised."

Girls Aloud are also notably one of the few British reality television acts to achieve continued success and longevity. According to The Times, Girls Aloud are the highest-earning UK reality television stars, having amassed a fortune of £25 million by May 2009. The figure was increased to £30 million the following year, following Cheryl's appearance on The X Factor. All five members were included in a 2010 list of Britain's richest stars under 30. Reviews of Girls Aloud's debut album noted the high quality of the album compared to output from other reality show contestants. In 2004, David Hooper of BBC Music exclaimed that "Girls Aloud are currently British pop royalty [...] in the ultra-fickle world of TV-generated pop, Girls Aloud have real staying power." Andrew Lynch of entertainment.ie said, "Girls Aloud really shouldn't have made it as far as a second album. [...] There's just one problem – the girls have a knack of coming up with utterly infectious pop songs".

Bono has referred to himself as a fan of the group, saying: "I think Girls Aloud are at the cutting edge of pop music. They are a great band and they deserve to be centre stage." Chris Martin also said that he is a fan of the group, referring to them as "the ultimate form of life," while Julie Burchill has stated that Girls Aloud are "simply the most perfect pop group since The Monkees." In addition, Girls Aloud have had their music covered by artists as varied as Arctic Monkeys, Bloc Party, and Coldplay, among others.

DiscographySound of the Underground (2003)What Will the Neighbours Say? (2004)Chemistry (2005)Tangled Up (2007)Out of Control (2008)

Tours

 What Will the Neighbours Say...? Tour (2005)
 Chemistry Tour (2006)
 Greatest Hits Tour (2007)
 Tangled Up Tour (2008)
 Out of Control Tour (2009)
 Ten: The Hits Tour (2013)

See also

List of awards and nominations received by Girls Aloud
List of best-selling girl groups
List of Girls Aloud songsR v Walker''

References

External links

 
Brit Award winners
English pop girl groups
English vocal groups
English synth-pop groups
English dance girl groups
Fascination Records artists
Musical groups established in 2002
Musical groups disestablished in 2013
Musical groups from London
Popstars winners
Teen pop groups
2002 establishments in England
2013 disestablishments in England
Vocal quintets
Polydor Records artists
BT Digital Music Awards winners